Prosoparia is a genus of moths of the family Erebidae. The genus was erected by Augustus Radcliffe Grote in 1883.

Taxonomy
The genus has previously been classified in the subfamily Calpinae of the family Noctuidae.

Species
Prosoparia anormalis (Barnes & McDunnough, 1912) Arizona
Prosoparia annuligera (Dognin, 1914) Colombia
Prosoparia estella (Jones, 1912) Brazil (São Paulo)
Prosoparia floridana Lafontaine & Dickel, 2009 Florida
Prosoparia funerea (Schaus, 1904) Brazil (Parana)
Prosoparia juno (Jones, 1912) Brazil (Rio de Janeiro)
Prosoparia marginata (Schaus, 1916) Suriname, French Guiana
Prosoparia micraster (Dognin, 1914) Colombia
Prosoparia nivosita (Schaus, 1904) Brazil (Parana)
Prosoparia perfuscaria Grote, 1883 Arizona
Prosoparia pygmaea (Schaus, 1916) French Guiana
Prosoparia rugosa (Dyar, 1914) Panama
Prosoparia tenebrosa (Schaus, 1913) Costa Rica
Prosoparia turpis (Schaus, 1913) Costa Rica
Prosoparia variata (Schaus, 1914) Suriname

References

Boletobiinae
Noctuoidea genera